The Institute for Mathematical Research (Forschungsinstitut für Mathematik, FIM) is a mathematical research institution located at ETH Zurich and founded in 1964 by Beno Eckmann. Its main goals are to promote and facilitating the exchange between ETH Zurich and international leading mathematicians.

The Institute offers a platform on which contacts of lasting values between faculty members of the Department of Mathematics of ETH, graduate students, members of the Swiss mathematical community at large and international researchers can be established. A lean staff structure of a director, a coordinator and an administrative assistant, a well-equipped infrastructure of 30 working spaces and an independent budget serve as the basis of the Institute. This structure enables the FIM to host about 200 guests per year, ranging from short term visits of one or two days to long term stays of up to one year. Furthermore, the FIM organises scientific activities like conferences, minicourses and advanced graduate courses. 

FIM is member of  ERCOM (European Research Centres on Mathematics) and is  the SNF and ETH Zurich.

List of directors
 2019–present Alessio Figalli 
 2009–2019 Tristan Rivière 
 1999–2009 Marc Burger
 1995–1999 Alain-Sol Sznitman
 1984–1995 Jürgen Moser
 1964–1984 Beno Eckmann

Advisory board
Internal Advisory Board: Rahul Pandharipande, Alain-Sol Sznitman, Rico Zenklusen

External Advisory Board: Viviane Baladi, Martin Hairer, Akshay Venkatesh, Cédric Villani

Guests
FIM maintains an online list  of the present and scheduled guests at the institute.

References

External links 
FIM website
FIM Weekly Bulletin (during semesters)

Mathematical institutes
Research institutes in Switzerland
Educational institutions established in 1964
ETH Zurich
1964 establishments in Switzerland
Schools of mathematics